Voskan, transliterated Vosgan in Western Armenian, is an Armenian-language given name. It may refer to:

Yervant Voskan (1855–1914), Ottoman Armenian sculptor
Voskan Yerevantsi (1614–1674), early Armenian publisher
Voskan Martikian (1867–1947), Ottoman Armenian politician and writer

Armenian masculine given names